Xywav, is a medication used to treat cataplexy or excessive daytime sleepiness (EDS). It contains a mixture of oxybate salts, namely Calcium oxybate, Magnesium Oxybate, Potassium Oxybate, and Sodium Oxybate. It is taken by mouth.

Manufactured by the Jazz Pharmaceuticals company, it was approved for medical use in the United States in July 2020.

Medical uses 
Xywav is indicated for the treatment of cataplexy in people aged seven years of age and older with narcolepsy.

In August 2021, the U.S. Food and Drug Administration (FDA) approved Xywav for the treatment of idiopathic hypersomnia.

Side Effects

Breathing Problems 
Slowed breathing, Trouble breathing, Sleep apnea

Mental Health Problems 
Confusion, Hallucination, Unusual or disturbing thoughts (abnormal thinking), Anxiety, Depression, Suicidal Thoughts or actions, Increased tiredness, feelings of guilt or worthlessness, Difficulty concentrating

Other 
Sleepwalking

Society and culture

Legal status 
Xywav was granted orphan drug designation in November 1994 by the U.S. Food and Drug Administration (FDA). The FDA granted the approval of Xywav to Jazz Pharmaceuticals plc in August 2021.

Other names 
In the testing phase of the drug, it was known as JZP-258

References 

Narcolepsy
Organic sodium salts
Orphan drugs
Treatment of sleep disorders